Ari Gröndahl is a Finnish professional ice hockey defenceman who currently plays for Vaasan Sport of the Mestis.

References

External links

Living people
Vaasan Sport players
Finnish ice hockey defencemen
1989 births
Ice hockey people from Helsinki